Balahi (also Romanized as Balahī; also known as Bala‘ī, Bal’ī, and Bele’ī) is a village in Shiveh Sar Rural District, Bayangan District, Paveh County, Kermanshah Province, Iran. At the 2006 census, its population was 29, in 7 families.

References 

Populated places in Paveh County